) is a province (wilaya) of northern Algeria.  It has a population of 1 million people and an area of 18,718 km², while its capital, also called M'sila, home to M'Sila University, has a population of about 100,000. 

Localities include Bou Saada and Maadid. Chott El Hodna, a salt lake, crosses into M'Sila. However, most of the region is semi-arid and undeveloped.

Additionally, M'Sila was the location of the first village constructed as part of a government-run program to transition nomadic Algerians to sedentary life using local materials.  

The village, now complete, was dubbed Maader and consists of houses, public and trading areas, and a mosque.

History
The province was created from parts of Batna (département), Médéa (département) and Sétif (département) in 1974.

Administrative divisions
The province is divided into 15 districts (daïras), which are further divided into 47 communes or municipalities.

Districts

 Aïn El Hadjel
 Aïn El Melh
 Ben S'Rour
 Bou Saâda
 Chellal
 Djebel Messaâd
 Hammam Dhalaâ
 Khoubana
 M'sila
 Magra
 Medjedel
 Ouled Derradj
 Ouled Sidi Brahim
 Sidi Aïssa
 Sidi Ameur

Communes

 1. Aïn El Hadjel
 2. Aïn El Melh
 3. Aïn Errich
 4. Aïn Fares
 5. Aïn Khadra
 6. Belaïba
 7. Ben Srour
 8. Beni Ilmane
 9. Benzouh
 10. Berhoum
 11. Bir Foda
 12. Bou-Saâda
 13. Bouti Sayeh
 14. Chellal
 15. Dehahna
 16. Djebel Messaad
 17. El Hamel
 18. El Houamed
 19. Hammam Dhalaa
 20. Khoubana
 21. Khatouti Sed Eldjir
 22. Maadid
 23. Maarif
 24. Magra
 25. M'cif
 26. Medjedel
 27. M'sila
 28. M'Tarfa
 29. Menaa
 30. Mohamed Boudiaf
 31. Ouanougha
 32. Ouled Addi Guebala
 33. Ouled Derraj
 34. Ouled Madhi
 35. Ouled Mansour
 36. Ouled Sidi Brahim
 37. Ouled Slimane
 38. Oultene
 39. Sidi Aïssa
 40. Sidi Ameur
 41. Sidi Hadjeres
 42. Sidi M'hamed
 43. Slim
 44. Souamaa
 45. Tamsa
 46. Tarmount
 47. Zarzour

Zawiya

 Zawiyet El Hamel

The creation of the Zaouïa complex dates back to the 19th century, founded by  born in 1823 in the vicinity of Hassi Bahbah in the Djelfa Province. After he died in 1897, his daughter Lalla Zaynab succeeded him until 1904.

The zaouïa consists of a mosque, a Koranic school, and the mausoleum where the founder and his successors rest.

See also

Hodna

References

External links
Encyclopaedia of the Orient - a brief description of M'Sila, focusing on its capital
BBC - a news article about some recent violence in M'Sila
Archnet - focuses on the Maader village project
Wetlands International - an in-depth description of M'Sila's wetland

 
Provinces of Algeria
States and territories established in 1974